Poramboku is a 2007 Telugu movie that is directed by Krishna Reddy. Navdeep plays the male lead role while Ekta Khosla plays the female lead. The film was released on 26 January 2007. The film was dubbed into Hindi as Ek Aur Aflatoon.

Plot
Karthik wants to become a film hero as his mother claimed that he was like a hero. As his mother dies in his childhood, Karthik's sister brings him up like mother. Karthik wants to join in a Film Institute but he has to pay Rs 1 lakh towards the fee. Chaitra (Ekta Khosla) reaches their village claiming that she was planning to do a telefilm. As she is rich, Karthik and his friends try to cash in on the opportunity. Chaitra's foster mother learns that she is in Dosakayalapalli and sends goons. But, Chaitra escapes from the place without any notice to Karthik. Finally Karthik reaches Hyderabad with the help of his sister and meets Chaitra in a dramatic turn of events. Karthik starts his efforts and finally gets the chance as a hero in a film. Again the goons attack Chaitra and try to whisk her away only to get saved by Karthik. Chaitra reveals her flashback. Her foster mother who brought her up plans to snatch her property by getting Chaitra married to her brother Satti. When Karthik was about to face the camera, that woman demands Chaitra. But Karthik categorically tells her that he is in love with her. Though Chaitra decides to sacrifice herself to make Karthik a winner, she could not hide her love. Finally Karthik wins her love and Chaitra's foster mother realizes her folly.

Cast
 Navdeep as Karthik
 Ekta Khosla as Chaitra 
 Vadivukkarasi as Chaitra's foster mother
 Suman Shetty
 Brahmanandam
 Narsing Yadav
 Satyam Rajesh
 Dharmavarapu Subrahmanyam
 M. S. Narayana
 Ali 
Kondavalasa Lakshmana Rao
Raghu Babu
Lakshmipati
Gundu Hanumantha Rao
Venu Madhav
Kavita

Soundtrack 

The film has six songs composed by Mani Sharma.

Release 
Full Hyderabad opined that "This not-over-the-top quality, not just of the acting but of everything else (locations, sets, music, action), is perhaps the undoing of Poramboku".

References

2007 films
2000s Telugu-language films